Don't Worry Be Happy is a studio album by American recording artist Wanda Jackson. It was released in 1989 via Amethyst Records and contained 12 tracks. It was Jackson's thirty fifth studio recording released in her career and the third issued on the Amethyst label. Don't Worry Be Happy was a collection of gospel songs, including the title track, which was first recorded as a pop song by Bobby McFerrin.

Background, content and release
During the 1950s and 1960s, Wanda Jackson became among the first women to have commercial success in the country and Rockabilly music genres. Her popular singles included "Fujiyama Mama", "Let's Have a Party", "Right or Wrong" and "Tears Will Be the Chaser for Your Wine". In the 1970s, she left her long-time record label to concentrate on gospel music. With her commercial success behind her, Jackson released recordings through the 1980s on a series of labels, including Amethyst Records. This included her third Amethyst release, Don't Worry Be Happy. The album was recorded in 1989 at Studio Seven, a recording venue located in Oklahoma City, Oklahoma. The sessions were produced by Gregg W. Gray.

Don't Worry Be Happy was a collection of ten gospel songs. The title track was a gospel reworking of Bobby McFerrin's pop hit. The album also included a cover version of Cristy Lane's "One Day at a Time". Several tracks were re-packaged for Don't Worry Be Happy. The latter song, "Don't Be Afraid", "This World Is Not My Home", "Jesus Put a Yodel in My Soul" and "Where Are the Babies" were first included on Jackson's 1984 studio album Teach Me to Love. Several new recordings were also included, such as "She Broke Her Promise" and "Instrument of Power". The project was released on Amethyst Records as a cassette. Five songs were included on either side of the tape. It was thirty fifth studio release of Jackson's career.

Track listing

Personnel
All credits are adapted from the liner notes of Don't Worry Be Happy.

Musical and technical personnel
 Ken Collins – Guitar
 Rocky Gribble – Banjo, guitar
 Gregg W. Gray – Background vocals, producer
 Wanda Jackson – Lead vocals
 Melodee Johnson – Background vocals
 Carolyn McCoy – Background vocals
 Mike Shelton – Background vocals
 Marty Shrabel – Bass
 Ric Wright – Guitar
 Lynn Williams – Drums
 Steve Wright – Drums

Release history

References

1989 albums
Wanda Jackson albums